Felisatti is an Italian surname. Notable people with the surname include: 

 Gian Pietro Felisatti (1950–2022), Italian music producer and songwriter
 Massimo Felisatti (1932–2016), Italian novelist, essayist, screenwriter, and director
 
Italian-language surnames